Joyce Eliason (May 14, 1934 – January 10, 2022) was an American television writer and producer. She was best known for writing TV miniseries including Titanic and The Last Don, and for the TV film The Jacksons: An American Dream. Eliason was one of the writers for the hit television series Love, American Style and wrote her first screenplay Tell Me a Riddle in 1980.

Eliason wrote two books before becoming a screenwriter, Fresh Meat/Warm Weather in 1974 and Laid Out in 1976. She died on January 10, 2022, at the age of 87.

Selected filmography
Eliason was principally a writer, but she also frequently served as a producer on films which she has written. A partial filmography is shown below.

Writer

 2009 America (TV movie)
 2005 Riding the Bus with My Sister (TV movie)
 2004 Gracie's Choice (TV movie)
 2003 Blessings (TV movie)
 2002 We Were the Mulvaneys (TV movie)
 2001 Amy & Isabelle (TV movie)
 2001 Blonde (TV movie)
 1997 The Last Don (TV miniseries)
 1996 Titanic (TV miniseries)
 1996 A Loss of Innocence (TV movie)
 1996 Sweet Temptation (TV movie)
 1995 Children of the Dust (TV miniseries)
 1994 Shadows of Desire (TV movie)
 1994 Oldest Living Confederate Widow Tells All (TV miniseries)
 1992 The Jacksons: An American Dream (TV miniseries)
 1989 Small Sacrifices (TV movie)
 1988 Elvis and Me (TV movie)
 1987 Mistress (TV movie)
 1985 Right to Kill? (TV movie)
 1985 Surviving: A Family in Crisis (TV movie)
 1981 Child Bride of Short Creek (TV movie)
 1980 Tell Me a Riddle (movie)
 1969 Love, American Style (TV series, some episodes)

Producer

 2001 Mulholland Drive (co-producer)
 1998 The Last Don II (TV miniseries) (executive producer, some episodes)
 1997 The Last Don (TV miniseries) (executive producer, some episodes)
 1996 A Loss of Innocence (TV movie) (executive producer)
 1996 Sweet Temptation (TV movie) (executive producer)
 1995 Children of the Dust (TV miniseries) (executive producer)
 1994 Shadows of Desire (TV movie) (executive producer)
 1994 Oldest Living Confederate Widow Tells All (TV miniseries, supervising producer)
 1992 The Jacksons: An American Dream (TV movie) (producer)

References

External links
 
 film reference: Joyce Eliason Biography

1934 births
2022 deaths
20th-century American screenwriters
20th-century American women writers
21st-century American screenwriters
21st-century American women writers
American television writers
People from Manti, Utah
American television producers
American women television producers
American women television writers
Screenwriters from Utah